is a Japanese politician serving in the House of Representatives in the Diet (national legislature) as a member of the New Komeito Party. A native of Choshi, Chiba and graduate of Hitotsubashi University, he was elected for the first time in 1990.

References

External links
 Official website in Japanese.

Living people
1953 births
Politicians from Chiba Prefecture
Hitotsubashi University alumni
New Komeito politicians
Members of the House of Representatives (Japan)
21st-century Japanese politicians